Rosaline is a 2022 American romantic comedy film directed by Karen Maine, written by Scott Neustadter and Michael H. Weber, and starring Kaitlyn Dever, Isabela Merced, Kyle Allen, Sean Teale, Christopher McDonald, Minnie Driver, and Bradley Whitford. It is based on the 2012 young adult novel When You Were Mine by Rebecca Serle, which in turn was inspired by William Shakespeare's Romeo and Juliet.

The film had its world premiere on October 6, 2022, at the El Capitan Theatre and was released on October 14, 2022, on Hulu in the United States, Disney+ internationally and Star+ in Latin America.

Plot
Rosaline is a forward-thinking, ambitious young lady from the house of Capulet. She has been secretly seeing Romeo, a member of the Capulets' rivals, the Montagues, and promises to meet him at the Capulet masquerade ball. Rosaline misses the ball due to a meeting with a suitor, Dario Penza, that goes awry when they are trapped on a boat in a storm; meanwhile, Romeo becomes smitten with Rosaline's cousin Juliet. Rosaline follows Romeo and sees him wooing Juliet.

Lord and Lady Capulet call on Rosaline's father Adrian, bringing Tybalt and Juliet with them. Rosaline informs Juliet that she knows of the latter's liaison with Romeo and spends more time with her, hoping to make Juliet forget about Romeo. Rosaline writes letters to Romeo and becomes dismayed when he does not write back. She learns Romeo is still courting Juliet and helps her spurn him, but Juliet finds a necklace engraved with Romeo's and Rosaline's names and realizes her cousin's plan. Juliet confidently declares Romeo will not return to Rosaline.

Rosaline convinces her friend Count Paris to court Juliet to distract from his homosexuality; the Capulets heartily accept the suit, to Juliet's dismay. Rosaline finds a letter from Romeo to Juliet and realizes the two are about to elope. Rosaline and Dario infiltrate the Montague estate, intending to stop the wedding, but are caught by guards and escape on horseback. Dario tells Rosaline he is rejoining the navy. Rosaline realizes she did not truly love Romeo and sends his letters back to Juliet, but the message is intercepted by Tybalt. Romeo kills Tybalt in a duel; their respective fathers demand that Romeo and Juliet's marriage be annulled and declare war on each other.

Dario and Rosaline come to Juliet's room, offering to smuggle her and Romeo to safety, only to learn that Juliet has already carried out her plan to fake her death. Rosaline is assumed to have been at fault, but escapes with the help of her father. She arrives at Juliet's body to find Romeo still alive, as Dario had informed him of the plan. Rosaline tells Romeo to pretend to be dead, and scolds the arriving Montagues and Capulets for their feud. The families depart. Rosaline and Dario see Romeo and Juliet off at the docks before sharing a kiss.

In a mid-credits scene, Romeo and Juliet try to find common interests on the boat.

Cast

Production
In May 2021, it was announced that 20th Century Studios had picked up the film, after initially starting development over at MGM. It was also announced that Karen Maine had been hired to direct the film based on a screenplay by Scott Neustadter and Michael H. Weber, which in turn is based on the 2012 young adult novel When You Were Mine by Rebecca Serle.

That same month it was announced that Kaitlyn Dever had been cast in the title role. Later in June 2021, it was announced that Isabela Merced had been cast as Juliet. In July 2021, Kyle Allen was cast as Romeo. That same month, Bradley Whitford was cast. In August, Minnie Driver signed on to play a take on The Nurse from the original story.

Filming had begun by September 2021.

Music
Drum & Lace and Ian Hultquist were attached to compose the film by May 2022. The two used instruments such as the harpsichord, lute, wooden flutes, and Renaissance drums alongside contemporary instruments like drum machines and analog and soft synths for the score, which was recorded in New York City. The two also had a 15-piece string ensemble.

Marketing
First look images were revealed on August 11, 2022. The official trailer was released on September 22, 2022, set to Icona Pop's 2012 song "I Love It". Writing for IndieWire, Samantha Bergeson stated that "Rosaline in part acts as a who's-who of Gen Z Hollywood", citing Dever, Merced, and Allen starring in the upcoming films Ticket to Paradise, Madame Web, and the live-action Masters of the Universe, respectively.

Release
Rosaline had its world premiere on October 6, 2022 at the El Capitan Theatre was released  on October 14, 2022, on Hulu in the United States, Disney+ internationally, Disney+ Hotstar in Southeast Asia and Star+ in Latin America.Disney announced that Rosaline will stream on Disney+ in the US but limited for 5 days, which would start from February 10 to February 15. It is no longer available on Disney+ in the US.

Reception

Audience viewership 
According to Whip Media, Rosaline was the 6th most streamed movie across all platforms in the United States, during the week of October 16, 2022, and the 8th most streamed movie across all platforms in the United States, during the week of October 21, 2022.

Critical response
 Metacritic assigned the film a weighted average score of 61 out of 100 based on 17 critics, indicating "generally favorable reviews."

References

External links
 
 

2022 romantic comedy films
2020s American films
2020s English-language films
2020s historical films
20th Century Studios films
21 Laps Entertainment films
American historical comedy films
American historical romance films
American romantic comedy films
Films about cousins
Films based on adaptations
Films based on American novels
Films based on Romeo and Juliet
Films based on young adult literature